Official Gazette of the Republic of Turkey is the national and only official journal of Turkey that publishes the new legislation and other official announcements. It is referred to as Resmî Gazete in short.

It has been published since 7 February 1921, approximately two years before the proclamation of the republic. The first fifteen issues of the newspaper were published once a week, the next three issues once every two weeks, the next three issues once a week. From 18 July 1921 to 10 September 1923, the newspaper was not published due to the Turkish War of Independence. Since Issue No. 763, which was released on 17 December 1927, it has been officially published under the name Türkiye Cumhuriyeti Resmî Gazete. As of 1 December 1928, it started to be printed with the new Turkish alphabet based on Latin letters.

Its content include legislation (laws, decisions of the Council of Ministers, regulations, communiqués etc.), certain case-law and official notices, especially public administration appointments and tender notices.

Resmî Gazete is also available from the web. Issues back to 27 June 2000 were available online until 2011. Today all issues are available and new issues have been published only online since 2018.

References

External links
 Official website 

Daily newspapers published in Turkey
Government gazettes
Government of Turkey
Publications established in 1920
1920 establishments in the Ottoman Empire